Polideportivo Municipal de San Rafael is an indoor arena in San Rafael, Mendoza, Argentina. It is primarily used for basketball and is one of the home arenas of the Obras Sanitarias along with Arena Obras Sanitarias. It holds 1,500 people.

References

Indoor arenas in Argentina
Basketball venues in Argentina